Catherine Winter may refer to:

 Catherine Winter (campaigner), Irish publicist and campaigner died in 1870
 Kathryn Winter, a British ice dancer